Ginger Moxey is a Bahamian businesswoman and politician. She has been Member of Parliament for Pineridge since 2021. She previously served as vice president of Grand Bahama Port Authority, resigning from the position in 2014 to pursue other ventures.

Electoral history

References 

Living people
Members of the House of Assembly of the Bahamas
Progressive Liberal Party politicians
21st-century Bahamian politicians
21st-century Bahamian women politicians
People from Grand Bahama
Year of birth missing (living people)